JS Estonia Tallinn was an Estonian football club based in Tallinn. It was founded in November 1930. The board included many ex-footballers and then active players that played for the team, such as Eduard Ellmann-Eelma and Arnold Pihlak.

History
The club played its first two seasons in Estonian First Division. After the successful promotion in 1932, they played in Estonian Top Division and only lost the title in the last game of the season to Sport Tallinn. But then they won five consecutive league titles from 1934 to 1938/39. They were unbeaten for the first two seasons in that run and even extended it until the middle of the third.

The club was dissolved in 1944.

Seasons

Honours
 Estonian Top Division (5): 1934, 1935, 1936, 1937–38, 1938–39
 Runners Up: 1933, 1939–40

References

Defunct football clubs in Estonia
Association football clubs established in 1930
Football clubs in Tallinn
Association football clubs disestablished in 1944
1930 establishments in Estonia
1944 disestablishments in Estonia